The 2012–13 Momentum One Day Cup was a domestic one-day cricket championship in South Africa. It was the 32nd time the championship was contested. The competition was played over 5 weeks, starting with the first match on 2 November 2012 and finishing with the final on 15 December 2012 at the Wanderers Stadium in Johannesburg. The trophy was shared by the Cape Cobras and Lions when the two attempts at playing the final were both abandoned due to rain. The first match saw the Cobras batting first, but was abandoned during the 17th over of their innings. The second match saw the Lions bat first and make 241/7 in their innings, but rain ended the match with the Cobras 69/2 after 11 overs, fewer than the 20 overs required for a Duckworth–Lewis calculation to be applied.

Group stage

Points table

Knockout stage
Of the 6 participants, the following 3 teams qualified for the knockout stage:

Semi-final

Final

Statistics

Most Runs

Source: Cricinfo

Most Wickets

Source: Cricinfo

External links
 Series home at ESPN Cricinfo

References 

South African domestic cricket competitions
Momentum One Day Cup